Acacia teretifolia is a shrub of the genus Acacia and the subgenus Phyllodineae. It is native to an area in the Wheatbelt, South West and Peel regions of Western Australia.

Description
It blooms between May and July forming simple inflorescences form singly or in pairs and have spherical flower-heads that contain 23 to 30 bright light golden coloured flowers. The dull yellow-brown seeds inside have a narrowly oblong shape and are arranged longitudinally inside the pod.

Taxonomy
The species was first formally described by the botanist George Bentham in 1842 as a part of the work Notes on Mimoseae, with a synopsis of species. as published in William Jackson Hooker's London Journal of Botany. The only synonym is Racosperma teretifolium as described by Leslie Pedley in 2003 before it was returned to genus Acacia in 2006. The type specimen was collected by James Drummond from around the Swan River.

Distribution
It has a discontinuous distribution from around Lesueur National Park in the north down to around Donnybrook in the south. It is usually found growing in sandy to sandy-clay soils over granite or laterite.

See also
 List of Acacia species

References

teretifolia
Acacias of Western Australia
Taxa named by George Bentham
Plants described in 1842